Velayat Stadium, is a football stadium located in Semnan, Iran. It is owned by the Ministry of Sport and Youth.

References

Football venues in Iran
Sports venues in Tehran